Iolaus cytaeis, the cytaeis sapphire, is a butterfly in the family Lycaenidae. It is found in Nigeria, Cameroon, Equatorial Guinea, Gabon, the Republic of the Congo, the Democratic Republic of the Congo and Zambia.

Subspecies
Iolaus cytaeis cytaeis (Nigeria: west and the Cross River loop), Cameroon, Bioko, Gabon, Congo, Democratic Republic of the Congo: Equateur)
Iolaus cytaeis caerulea (Riley, 1928) (Democratic Republic of the Congo, Zambia)

References

External links

Die Gross-Schmetterlinge der Erde 13: Die Afrikanischen Tagfalter. Plate XIII 68 g

Butterflies described in 1875
Iolaus (butterfly)
Butterflies of Africa
Taxa named by William Chapman Hewitson